Kingswood is a suburban town and unparished area in the South Gloucestershire district, in the ceremonial county of Gloucestershire, England, bordering the eastern edge of the City of Bristol.

Broadly speaking, Kingswood spans the area from John Cabot Academy in the west to the A4174 ring road in the east. Some areas which are in close proximity to Kingswood, such as Two Mile Hill and St George East (both located within the City of Bristol) and parts of Hanham and Warmley Hill are often considered to be part of Kingswood by locals.

The border between South Gloucestershire and the City of Bristol is situated at the western end of Kingswood's High Street. Although anything beyond this point is technically no longer Kingswood 'proper', locals often consider the shops and residential areas that fringe the road named 'Two Mile Hill' (located within the area of the same name) to be a continuation of Kingswood. In 2011 it had a population of 40,734.

Royal Forest

In Saxon times, The 'King's Wood' was a royal hunting estate which surrounded Bristol, extending as far as Filwood in South Bristol. "From early days the Constable of Bristol Castle, the king's officer in the area, was also the Chief Ranger of the Kingswood Forest and the first of these recorded is Ella who died in 920. At the edge of the forest, to the north of the River Froom, lay the little hamlet of Stapleton, the name of which is Saxon in origin, being held to mean "The farm, homestead or croft - by or near the Stapol, post or pillar"".

Demography

Kingswood and Staple Hill are the only areas that are unparished (an area that doesn't have an incorporated town council on its own) in South Gloucestershire. Up to the 2011 Census, Kingswood was considered by ONS as part of Bristol, being within its urban subdivision. This meant that Kingswood wasn't recognised as an individual settlement either statistically or administratively, being unparished and part of a larger urban subdivision, parliament constituency and district with all three divisions containing other areas. However, in the 2021 Census, Kingswood was separated out from the administrative area of Bristol and is now recognised as a settlement in its own right by the Office of National Statistics; this has resulted in Kingswood becoming the largest settlement by population in the ceremonial county of Gloucestershire. Kingswood is made up of three wards: Woodstock, New Cheltenham and Kingswood Wards These wards had a combined population of 40,734 in 2011, with a largely white British population.

Women in Kingswood had the fourth lowest life expectancy at birth, 74.3 years, of any ward in England and Wales in 2016.

Transport
Kingswood High Street is situated around 3 miles (5 km) south of the M4 and 2.5 miles (4 km) east of Lawrence Hill railway station. Buses connect the town to surrounding areas including the City Centre, Southmead Hospital, Keynsham and Cribbs Causeway. Six national rail stations currently exist within South Gloucestershire. However, they are all concentrated around the highly developed North Fringe area which encompasses Filton and Bradley Stoke. However, Bristol mayor Marvin Rees' proposals for a 'Bristol Underground' envisage a line serving the East Fringe of Bristol.

Coal mining

The Kingswood area first came into industrial prominence in the late 17th century, because of coal mining. Typical of these were coal fields in the Easton and Coalpit Heath/Yate areas. The coal mining history still affects the town with gardens occasionally opening up. The local MP has petitioned in Parliament for full surveys of the coal mines under the town. An archaeological excavation of the Wade Street area of Kingswood  uncovered artisans' houses that were established in the early 18th century. These dwellings were demolished as part of a slum clearance project in the mid 20th century.

The Whit Walk
There is an annual procession held on the morning of the Whit Bank Holiday. Its origins are uncertain, but it appears to have taken place at least since 1939. The walk is the subject of an ethnographic study by the English anthropologist Timothy Jenkins.

References

External links

 Kingswood Rugby Club - The Official Home of Kingswood RFC
 Kingswood and Mangotsfield Archaeological Assessment Report 1997
 Photographic Record of Kingswoods Past
 Kingswood Ten Sing – Youth performing arts group
 Audio from a talk entitled The Kingswood Colliers & the Cock Rd. Gang by Steve Mills for Bristol Radical History Group

 
Towns in Gloucestershire
Areas of Bristol
Unparished areas in Gloucestershire
Former civil parishes in Gloucestershire